Myrtwa is the promo EP by the Polish progressive band Indukti.

Track listing

 Turecki - (4:35)
 Mantra (live)* - (8:35)
 Tap (live)* - (11:11)

'* Recorded in Proxima 21.11.2000

Line-Up 
 Maciej Adamczyk - bass guitar
 Bartek Nowak - drums
 Ewa Jabłońska - violin
 Baretek Kuzia - guitar
 Piotr Kocimski - guitar

External links
 Myrtwa at  Encyclopaedia Metallum
 

Indukti albums
2002 debut EPs